Diana Torrieri (
Angela Vittoria Torrieri; 9 August 1913 – 27 March 2007) was an Italian actress. She worked in theater, films, television and radio.

Life and career 
Born in Canosa di Puglia, Torrieri made her professional debut in 1937, in the stage company led by Paola Borboni, with whom she even toured in the United States. During the war, she was a partisan and a member of the Action Party and was even wounded during the liberation of Milan. In 1949, she tried to commit suicide by swallowing sleeping pills.

Active on stage until the late 1960s, she worked with the theatrical companies of Giorgio Strehler, Vittorio Gassman, Anton Giulio Bragaglia, Giorgio Albertazzi, Sergio Tofano and Memo Benassi, among others.

Selected filmography

 Il barone di Corbò (1939)
 Don Pasquale (1940)
 La primadonna (1943)
 Incontro con Laura (1945)
 Via Belgarbo (1957) (TV movie)
 Fedra (1957) (TV movie)
 La promessa (1979) (TV movie)

References

External links 
 

1913 births
2007 deaths
Italian film actresses
Italian television actresses
20th-century Italian actresses
Italian stage actresses
Italian radio actresses
Italian resistance movement members